Ciro in Armenia is a dramma per musica or opera in three acts by composer Maria Teresa Agnesi Pinottini. The work premiered in Milan on 26 December 1753 at the Teatro Regio Ducale. The work uses an Italian language libretto by the composer which is based on a work by Umberto Manferrari and G. Manfredi.

Background
Pinottini was one of the earliest female Italian opera composers, and this opera was considered her finest achievement. Pinottini had previously composed two other operas; the first of which, II Restauro di Arcadia, also premiered at the Teatro Regio Ducal in 1747. 

The complete score of Ciro in Armenia was preserved in Dresden, but was transferred by the Red Army during World War II to Russia. Today it is owned by the Russian State Library in Moscow. Parts from the opera survive also in the collection of the library at the Milan Conservatory, some of which have been recorded.  Tom Service, music critic for The Guardian, included the work is his 2015 list of the 10 best operas written by women composers.

Roles
The information in this section is taken from the published libretto.

Synopsis
The story is elaborated (unhistorically) from Xenophon's account in his Anabasis of Cyrus the Younger's campaign in 401 BC. The plot centres on the plans of Ciro (Cyrus) to wage war against Assyria in league with the Medes. However the King of Armenia, formerly a vassal of the Medes, changes allegiance to side with the Assyrians, prompting Cyrus to invade Armenia. Cyrus quickly overwhelms the Armenians. Tigrane, son of the Armenian King Arsace, was a childhood friend of Ciro and persuades him generously to forgive Arsace, allowing the marriage of Tigrane with the Phrygian princess Palmide.

References

External links
 Libretto in Google Books.

Operas
1753 operas
Italian-language operas
Lost operas
Operas set in Armenia
Cultural depictions of ancient Persian people
Cultural depictions of kings
Operas set in ancient Persia
Operas based on real people